The banded sand catshark (Atelomycterus fasciatus) is a catshark of the family Scyliorhinidae found in the Indo-West Pacific Ocean, endemic to northern Australia between latitudes 10° S and 21° S, at depths between .

References

 

banded sand catshark
Marine fish of Northern Australia
Marine fish of Western Australia
banded sand catshark